In relational databases a virtual column is a table column whose value is automatically computed using other columns values, or another deterministic expression. Virtual columns are defined of SQL:2003 as Generated Column, and are only implemented by some DBMSs, like MariaDB, SQL Server, Oracle, PostgreSQL, SQLite and Firebird (database server) (COMPUTED BY syntax).

Implementation 

There are two types of virtual columns:
 Virtual columns;
 Persistent columns.

Virtual columns values are computed on the fly when needed, for example when they are returned by a SELECT statement. Persistent column values are computed when a row is inserted in a table, and they are written like all other values. They can change if other values change. Both virtual and persistent columns have advantages and disadvantages: virtual columns don't consume space on the disk, but they must be computed every time a query refers to them; persistent columns don't require any CPU time, but they consume disk space. However, sometimes a choice is not available, because some DBMS's support only one column type (or neither of them).

IBM Db2 

IBM Db2 supports Virtual column of Version 8 as Generated column.

MariaDB 

MariaDB is a MySQL fork. Virtual columns were added in the 5.2 tree.

Expressions that can be used to compute the virtual columns have the following limitations:
 They must be deterministic.
 They cannot return constant values.
 They cannot use User Defined Functions or Stored Procedures.
 They cannot include other virtual columns.
 They cannot make use of subqueries.

Persistent columns can be indexed and can be part of a foreign key, with a few small limitations concerning constraint enforcement.

Virtual columns can only be used on tables which use a storage engine which supports them. Storage engines supporting virtual columns are:
 InnoDB
 MyISAM
 Aria

MRG_MyISAM tables can be based on MyISAM tables which include persistent columns; but the corresponding MRG_MyISAM column should be defined as a regular column.

Syntax 

A CREATE TABLE or ALTER TABLE statement can be used to add a virtual column. The syntax used to define a virtual column is the following:
<type>  [GENERATED ALWAYS]  AS   ( <expression> )  [VIRTUAL | PERSISTENT]  [UNIQUE] [UNIQUE KEY] [COMMENT <text>]

 type is the column's data type.
 expression is the SQL expression which returns the column's value for each row.
 text is an optional column comment.

MySQL 

Support for virtual columns, known in MySQL as generated columns, started becoming available in MySQL 5.7. Various limitations on their use have been relaxed in subsequent versions.

Oracle 

Since version 11g, Oracle supports virtual columns.

SQL Server 

Microsoft SQL Server supports virtual columns, but they are called Computed Columns.

SQL Server supports both persisted and non-persisted computed columns.

Firebird 
Firebird has always supported virtual columns as its precursor InterBase supports it, called Computed Columns.

Firebird supports virtual columns, not persistent ones and allows for sub-selects, calling built in functions, external functions and stored routines in the virtual column expression.

Syntax 

Creating a virtual column can be done during table creation and when adding columns to an existing table, the syntax used to define a virtual column is the following:
column_name [type] COMPUTED BY (expression)
or the industry standard
column_name [type] GENERATED ALWAYS AS (expression)

PostgreSQL 

Since version 12, PostgreSQL supports virtual columns, known as generated columns.

SQLite 

Since version 3.31.0 (2020-01-22), SQLite supports virtual columns, known as generated columns.

Notes

External links 
 Virtual Columns in MariaDB's documentation.
 MariaDB 5.2: What would you use virtual columns for? on OpenLife.cc
 Virtual Columns in Oracle Database 11g Release 1
 Computed Columns in SQL Server 2008

Database management systems